Perry Park is an unincorporated community and a census-designated place (CDP) located in Douglas County, Colorado, United States. The CDP is a part of the Denver–Aurora–Lakewood, CO Metropolitan Statistical Area. The population of the Perry Park CDP was 1,646 at the United States Census 2010. The Perry Park Metropolitan District and the Perry Park Water & Sanitation District provide services. The Larkspur post office (Zip Code 80118) serves the area.

History

The Perry Park area was originally inhabited by the Ute, Kiowa, Arapaho and Cheyenne Native American tribes. It was not settled by American immigrants until the 1858 Pike's Peak Gold Rush near present-day Colorado Springs.  Then ranchers such as Ben Quick and George Ratcliffe began settling in the area.  In 1870 John D. Perry, president of the Kansas Pacific Railroad, visited Colorado and purchased the  "Pleasant Park" that would eventually be named Perry Park.  Mr. Perry's son, Charles, became a permanent resident of the ranch and raised short-horn cattle in the area until his death in 1876.  Charles Perry died as a result of being kicked by a horse on the ranch.  In 1888 John Perry, along with a number of other investors created the Red Stone Town, Land, & Mining Company which attempted to turn Pleasant Park into a resort destination.  A dam was constructed, creating Lake Wauconda.  A large hotel was built southwest of the lake.

One of the investors, Charles Roberts, built one of the only homes in the new development along the shores of Lake Wauconda (even though the entire area surrounding the lake was platted for home development).  The Roberts home—the Manor House—is now the clubhouse for Perry Park Country Club.

Attempts to extend the railroad running through Larkspur directly into the park failed and the resort failed to prosper.  Land deed problems contributed to the failure of the resort since many parcels of land could not be legally traced to the owners.  The ranch changed hands many times in the early to mid-1900s.  The hotel was eventually destroyed by fire.

Perry Park Ranch
In 1967, Lee Stubblefield (a retired Air Force officer) purchased the ranch for $2,000,000 and formed the Colorado Western Development Company.  Mr. Stubblefield platted the current layout of Perry Park Ranch.  The Perry Park Country Club was also developed during this time and opened in 1971.  The platted area within the park continues to be developed by outside real estate investors and future residents.  As platted lots become improved with roads and utilities (initiated and paid for by lot owners), homes are permitted to be built.

Geography
Perry Park is located in south-central Douglas County at the foot of the Rampart Range, the eastern edge of the Rocky Mountains in this area. Perry Park Ranch is known for the dramatic array of 'red rock'  sandstone rock formations. They are part of the Fountain Formation, which is found along the eastern mountain face of the Front Range. The Pike National Forest and Rampart Range neighbor the community to the west.

Demographics

Education
The Douglas County School District serves Perry Park.

Area events
The Colorado Renaissance Festival, at Larkspur, is an annual summer event in the area.

See also

Outline of Colorado
Index of Colorado-related articles
State of Colorado
Colorado cities and towns
Colorado census designated places
Colorado counties
Douglas County, Colorado
List of statistical areas in Colorado
Front Range Urban Corridor
North Central Colorado Urban Area
Denver-Aurora-Boulder, CO Combined Statistical Area
Denver-Aurora-Broomfield, CO Metropolitan Statistical Area

References

External links

Perry Park Metropolitan District
Perry Park Water & Sanitation District
Perry Park Country Club
Douglas County website
Douglas County School District

Census-designated places in Douglas County, Colorado
Census-designated places in Colorado
Denver metropolitan area
Unincorporated communities in Douglas County, Colorado
Unincorporated communities in Colorado